Francis Xavier Bellotti (born May 3, 1923) is an American lawyer and politician. In his first campaign he was the Democratic nominee for District Attorney of Norfolk County in 1958, but was defeated in the general election. In 1962 Bellotti was elected as Lieutenant Governor for the Commonwealth of Massachusetts from 1963 to 1965.

In 1964 he had challenged the sitting governor of his own party, Endicott Peabody, and defeated him in the Democratic Primary; but lost in the general election to John Volpe who thus regained the seat he had lost in 1962. In 1966 Belloti was the Democratic nominee for Attorney General but was defeated by Republican Elliot Richardson. From 1975 to 1987 he served three terms as Massachusetts Attorney General. In that capacity he instilled professionalism among his staff, was a leader for civil rights and served as President of the National Association of Attorneys General. He sought the nomination of the Democratic party for governor in 1970 and in 1990, but was defeated in the Democratic primary election in both elections losing to Kevin White and John Silber respectively.

In his official capacity for the state he was the named party in the commercial speech case: First National Bank of Boston v. Bellotti, 435 U.S. 765 (1978), which established that corporations have some free speech rights under the First Amendment to the United States Constitution.

Bellotti was born in Boston. He graduated from Tufts University in 1947 and received his J.D. degree from Boston College in 1952. He served in the United States Navy during World War II reaching the rank of Lieutenant (junior grade). Since leaving office, Bellotti has practiced law in Boston, Massachusetts, with the firm of Mintz, Levin, Cohn, Ferris, Glovsky and Popeo. He is the father of twelve children, including Norfolk County Sheriff Michael G. Bellotti.

In 2012, the district courthouse in Quincy, Massachusetts, was named in his honor.

He is currently the Vice Chairman of Arbella Insurance Group.

References

External links 

 
  Mintz, Levin biography
  Martindale-Hubbell Legal Directory profile
 Getty Images

Living people
1923 births
Massachusetts Attorneys General
Lieutenant Governors of Massachusetts
Massachusetts lawyers
Tufts University alumni
Boston College Law School alumni
Massachusetts Democrats
20th-century American politicians
United States Navy personnel of World War II
United States Navy officers
Mintz Levin people